The Bishop of Worcester is the head of the Church of England Diocese of Worcester in the Province of Canterbury, England.

The title can be traced back to the foundation of the diocese in the year 680. From then until the 16th century, the bishops were in full communion with the Roman Catholic Church. During the Reformation, the church in England broke away from the authority of the Pope and the Roman Catholic Church, at first temporarily and later more permanently. Since the Reformation, the Bishop and Diocese of Worcester has been part of the Church of England and the Anglican Communion.

The diocese covers most of the county of Worcestershire, including the Metropolitan Borough of Dudley and parts of the City of Wolverhampton. The Episcopal see is in the city of Worcester where the bishop's throne is located at the Cathedral Church of Christ and the Blessed Virgin Mary. The bishop's official residence is the Old Palace, Worcester. The bishops had two residences outside the city: Hartlebury Castle near Kidderminster from the 13th century to 2007 and a palace at Alvechurch until it was pulled down in the 17th century.

From the elevations of Oswald of Worcester in 961 at Worcester and 972 at York, until 1023 the see was usually held jointly with the (then rather poorer) Archbishopric of York.

The current bishop of Worcester is John Inge.

List of bishops

Pre-Conquest

Conquest to Reformation

During the Reformation

Post-Reformation

Assistant bishops
Among those who have served as assistant bishops of the diocese are:
19361944 (d.): Ridley Duppuy, Canon Residentiary of Worcester Cathedral, Archdeacon of Worcester (from 1938), Vice-Dean of Worcester (from 1940) and former Bishop of Victoria
1946January 1953 (ret.): Bertram Lasbrey, Rector of St Andrew's &c. Worcester and former Bishop on the Niger
19531965 (ret.): Cyril Stuart, Rector of St Andrew's &c. Worcester (until 1965), Canon of Worcester thereafter, and former Bishop of Uganda
19681991 (ret.): Nicholas Allenby, former Bishop of Kuching
19892008 (d.): Kenneth Woollcombe, assistant priest in Upton Snodsbury (1989–?), former Bishop of Oxford and Assistant Bishop of London for Westminster

References

Footnotes

Bibliography

External links
Diocese of Worcester

 
Worcester
Bishops of Worcester
Christianity in Worcester, England

Christianity in Worcestershire
Anglican Diocese of Worcester
680 establishments